Gian Gerolamo Campanili (died 22 June 1626) was a Roman Catholic prelate who served as Bishop of Isernia (1608–1625)
and Bishop of Lacedonia (1625–1626).

Biography
Gian Gerolamo Campanili was born in Naples, Italy.
On 24 December 1608, he was appointed during the papacy of Pope Paul V as Bishop of Lacedonia.
On 27 January 1625, he was appointed during the papacy of Pope Urban VIII as Bishop of Isernia.
He served as Bishop of Isernia until his death on 22 June 1626.

While bishop, he was the principal consecrator of Alessandro Bosco, Bishop of Carinola (1619).

References

External links and additional sources
 (for Chronology of Bishops) 
 (for Chronology of Bishops)  
 (for Chronology of Bishops) 
 (for Chronology of Bishops) 

17th-century Italian Roman Catholic bishops
Bishops appointed by Pope Paul V
Bishops appointed by Pope Urban VIII
1626 deaths